Blade of Triumph is the fourth full-length album by Danish power metal band Iron Fire. It was released in 2007 by Napalm Records.

Track listing
 "Dragonheart"  - 5:47
 "Bloodbath of Knights" - 4:23
 "Dawn of Victory" - 4:52
 "Lord of the Labyrinth" - 4:23
 "Bridges Will Burn" - 4:38
 "Follow the Sign" - 4:37
 "Steel Invaders" - 4:32
 "Jackal's Eye" - 5:36
 "Legend of the Magic Sword"  - 4:27
 "Gladiator's Path" - 4:11
 "Blade of Triumph" - 7:26

Album line-up 
Martin Steene -  Vocals
Kirk Backarach - Guitars & Keyboards
J.J. - Guitars
Martin Lund - Bass
Jens B. - Drums

References

2007 albums
Iron Fire albums
Napalm Records albums